Daniel De Sales McGeehan (June 7, 1885 – July 12, 1955) was an infielder in Major League Baseball who played in  for the St. Louis Cardinals. His older brother, Connie McGeehan, played for the Philadelphia Athletics in the 1903 season. 
 
Born in Jeddo, Pennsylvania, McGeehan played briefly for the Cardinals as a backup for second baseman Miller Huggins.

In a three-game career, McGeehan had two singles in nine at-bats for a .222 batting average, droving in one run, but did not have any hits for extra bases.

He also played seven seasons in the Minor leagues between 1909 and 1915, most of them with the Scranton Miners and Allentown.

McGeehan died in Hazleton, Pennsylvania, at the age of 70.

Sources
Baseball Reference – Major league profile
Baseball Reference – Minor league career

Major League Baseball second basemen
St. Louis Cardinals players
Allentown (minor league baseball) players
Manchester Textiles players
Scranton Miners players
Wilson Tobacconists players
Baseball players from Pennsylvania
1885 births
1955 deaths